Special Task Force Command (Turkish: Özel Görev Kuvveti Komutanlığı — ÖGKK) is special force unit within the Security Forces Command of the Turkish Republic of Northern Cyprus. Unit consisting of officers of different classes and ranks, non-commissioned officers, special officers and elite soldiers who have been selected and trained in all kinds of terrain and climatic conditions against the elimination of internal and external threats. ÖGKK was established in 1992, directly affiliated with the Security Forces Command.

See also 

 Security Forces Command
 Cyprus Turkish Peace Force Command KTBK
 TRNC Coast Guard Command
Directorate General for Police

External links 

 Official website (Turkish)

References 

Military of Northern Cyprus
Aviation in Northern Cyprus
Special forces